Miss St. Vincent and the Grenadines is a national beauty pageant in Saint Vincent and the Grenadines.

History
The Miss SVG held for the first time in 1951 by Queen of Carnival of the Saint Vincent and the Grenadines. The name's title carried from 1951 to 1985. During this period Adult suffrage came into being and revolutionized the society. Reestablished as the new Miss SVG, would continue the tradition of empowering young Vincentian women. Carnival Development Corporation (CDC) is currently owning the most prestigious beauty pageant in the country.

International competitions
From 1964 to 2006 Miss Saint Vincent and the Grenadines winners represent the country at Miss Universe pageant. Meanwhile, the Miss World contestants from SVG made their participation between 1978 and 1994. Nowadays there is no option to SVG to return at  Miss World.

Titleholders

References

External links
 www.carnivalsvg.com

St. Vincent and the Grenadines
Recurring events established in 1951
Entertainment events in Saint Vincent and the Grenadines